Greatest Hits: 87–99 is a 2003 compilation album by Australian singer Kylie Minogue. The album was a budget release, released only in Australia around the same time as Minogue's ninth studio album Body Language. The track list is an extension of her 1992 Greatest Hits compilation, adding the singles released during the Deconstruction period (1994–1998). The album also includes a cover of Russell Morris' song "The Real Thing", recorded in 1999. The accompanying DVD (titled Greatest Hits 87–98) features every Minogue music video released during the PWL and Deconstruction years (the only Minogue DVD to do so). However, some videos, like the Australian video for “Locomotion” and the full-length version of “Where Is The Feeling?” are not featured.

Track listing
All songs on disc one written and produced by Mike Stock, Matt Aitken and Pete Waterman, except where noted.

Charts

Certifications

|-

References

2003 greatest hits albums
Kylie Minogue compilation albums
Kylie Minogue video albums
2003 video albums
Music video compilation albums